The following is a list of Tanzanian university chancellors and vice-chancellors. The Chancellor is the ceremonial head, while the Vice-Chancellor is chief academic officer and chief executive.

See also
 List of university leaders
 List of universities in Tanzania
St. John's University of Tanzania,
Vice Chancellor: Prof. Yohana Msanjila

References

 
University chancellors and vice-chancellors
C
C
Tanzanian
Tanzania